Milena Kordež (born 10 September 1953) is a Slovenian cross-country skier. She competed in two events at the 1976 Winter Olympics, representing Yugoslavia.

Cross-country skiing results

Olympic Games

World Championships

References

External links
 

1953 births
Living people
Slovenian female cross-country skiers
Olympic cross-country skiers of Yugoslavia
Cross-country skiers at the 1976 Winter Olympics
Sportspeople from Kranj